Sergey Aleksandrovich Tarabanko (born 25 August 1949) is a retired Russian ice speedway rider who won seven world titles between 1975 and 1981.

Biography
Tarabanko was born in Moscow, but was soon moved to Kirovsk and then Angarsk, where he started training in cross-country motorcycle racing. After working as a turner at a factory, between 1968 and 1972 he served in the army. In 1975 he graduated from the University of Pedagogy in Chita. He then worked as a test driver for a Jawa Motors factory in Novosibirsk, and in 1977 moved to Moscow to coach motorcycle racers. He participated in the 1988 Winter Olympics as a driver of the Soviet Olympic team and later worked as the head of the CSKA racing team in Moscow.

World Final appearances

Individual Ice Speedway World Championship
 1974 -  Nässjö - 4th - 10pts
 1975 -  Moscow - Winner - 30pts
 1976 -  Assen - Winner 
 1977 -  Inzell - Winner 
 1978 -  Assen - Winner 
 1980 -  Kalinin - 2nd

References

1949 births
Living people
Soviet speedway riders
Ice Speedway World Champions